Selenochlamys pallida is a species of predatory air-breathing land slug. It is a shell-less pulmonate gastropod mollusc in the family Trigonochlamydidae.

Selenochlamys pallida is the type species of the genus Selenochlamys.

Distribution 
The distribution of Selenochlamys pallida includes:
 Western Georgia
 Abkhazia
 South of Maykop, Russia
 Northern Turkey (Vilayets Samsum, Çoruh)

The type locality is Kutaisi, Georgia.

Description 
The size of preserved specimens is 13–18 mm. Live individuals are larger.

Ecology 
Selenochlamys pallida is found in Turkey. It lives under stones or in moss, in mountains that have deciduous forests.

References
This article incorporates public domain text from the reference.

Trigonochlamydidae
Gastropods described in 1883